Romario Andrés Ibarra Mina (born 24 September 1994) is an Ecuadorian professional footballer who plays for Liga MX club Pachuca and the Ecuador national team. He is the younger brother of Renato Ibarra.

International career

On 5 October 2017, Ibarra made his debut for the senior national team in a World Cup qualifying match against Chile.

Personal life
Romario's brother, Renato Ibarra, is also a professional footballer and represented Ecuador at senior level as well.

Career statistics

International

International goals

''Scores and results table. Ecuador's goal tally first:

Honours
Pachuca
Liga MX: Apertura 2022

References

External links
Romario Ibarra profile at Federación Ecuatoriana de Fútbol 

1994 births
Living people
People from Atuntaqui
Ecuadorian footballers
Association football midfielders
Ecuadorian Serie A players
Ecuadorian Serie B players
Major League Soccer players
Liga MX players
C.D. Universidad Católica del Ecuador footballers
L.D.U. Quito footballers
Minnesota United FC players
C.F. Pachuca players
Ecuador international footballers
Ecuadorian expatriate footballers
Ecuadorian expatriates in the United States
Expatriate soccer players in the United States
Expatriate footballers in Mexico
2019 Copa América players
2022 FIFA World Cup players